Acharya Guptinandi Ji is a Digambara monk initiated by Acharya Kunthusagar.

Biography
Acharya Guptinandi was born in the city of Bhopal, Madhya Pradesh on 1 August 1972. He did his B.Com as a Sravaka (lay follower) and was initiated as a Digambara monk on 22 July 1991 by Acharya Kunthusagar. In December 2014, he went to Jaipur, Rajasthan, where he gave the title of Yuva Munishi to Muni Suyashgupt and Jin Dharma Prabhavak to Muni Chandragupta. He got the Acharya Pad on 27 May 2001 in Indore, Madhya Pradesh.

He is the founder of Shri Dharm Tirth. He supervised the Panchkalyanak at Manasinganahalli, held in 2013.

Chaturmas
2014 – Bholanath Nagar, Delhi
2011 – Badout, Meerut, Uttar Pradesh
2009 – Sonagiri, Madhya Pradesh

Notes

Sources

External links
 

1972 births
Living people
People from Bhopal
Indian Jain writers
Jain acharyas
Indian Jain monks
20th-century Indian Jains
20th-century Jain monks
20th-century Indian monks
21st-century Indian Jains
21st-century Jain monks
21st-century Indian monks